Blaschkoallee is a Berlin U-Bahn station located on the U7.
Opened in 1963 with the planned name "Buschkrug" (arch. W.Düttmann). The next station is Parchimer Allee.

References

U7 (Berlin U-Bahn) stations
Buildings and structures in Neukölln
Railway stations in Germany opened in 1963